Sa-Deuce was an American R&B group composed of Janai Abercrombie and Paula Asiah Pierre-Lewis. They were signed to Eastwest Records. Their first release came in 1995 when they released the single "Don't Waste My Time" which peaked at #42 on the Hot R&B/Hip-Hop Singles & Tracks. On March 26, 1996, Eastwest Records released the group's self-titled debut album,  peaking at #79 on the Top R&B/Hip-Hop Albums.

Discography
1996: Sa-Deuce

African-American musical groups
American contemporary R&B musical groups
Musical groups established in 1995
Musical groups disestablished in 1996
American girl groups